Bond v United States, 529 U.S. 334 (2000), was a United States Supreme Court Fourth Amendment case that applied the ruling of Minnesota v. Dickerson to luggage, which held that police may not physically manipulate items without a warrant without violating the Fourth Amendment.

Background 
During an immigration status check of a passenger on a bus in Texas, a United States Border Patrol Agent squeezed the soft luggage of Steven D Bond.  The Agent thought the bag held a "brick-like" object. After Bond admitted that it was his bag and then consented to a search of the bag, the Border Patrol Agent found a "brick" of methamphetamine. Bond was arrested and indicted on Federal drug charges. Bond moved to suppress the "brick" of methamphetamine on the basis that the agent had conducted an illegal search of the bag when squeezing it. He claimed that this was a violation of the Federal Constitution's Fourth Amendment prohibition on unreasonable searches and seizures. The district court denied the motion, and found Bond guilty. The Court of Appeals held that the agent's manipulation of the bag was not a search under the Fourth Amendment.

Opinion of the Court 
In a 7-2 opinion written by Chief Justice William Rehnquist, the Court held that Agent Cantu's physical manipulation of Bond's bag violated the Fourth Amendment."

References

External links
 

United States Fourth Amendment case law
United States Supreme Court cases
United States Supreme Court cases of the Rehnquist Court
2000 in United States case law